Syria competed at the 1984 Summer Olympics in Los Angeles, United States.
Joseph Atiyeh won the nation's first ever Olympic medal.

Medalists

Competitors
The following is the list of number of competitors in the Games.

Boxing

Men

Diving

Shooting

Open

Weightlifting

Men

Wrestling

Men's freestyle

Men's Greco-Roman

References
Official Olympic Reports
International Olympic Committee results database

Nations at the 1984 Summer Olympics
1984
Olympics, Summer